Karen Hayes is a fictional character on the television program 24 portrayed by actress Jayne Atkinson. She appeared as a recurring character in twelve episodes of the fifth season and a main cast member in eighteen episodes of the sixth season.

Concept and creation
Actress Laurie Metcalf was originally cast as Karen Hayes before being replaced by Jayne Atkinson. Producer Howard Gordon praised Metcalf's acting abilities, but said "the role was not the right fit for the actress" and they mutually agreed to recast the part.

Characterization
Before joining the United States Department of Homeland Security, Hayes was an FBI agent. She worked within the FBI's Counterterrorism Division, eventually becoming Senior Agent and later a Special Agent in Charge.

Hayes has a Bachelor of Arts in Sociology from Princeton University. Atkinson says that her character is cautious especially when it comes to "civil liberties and profiling a certain population."

Appearances

24: Season 5
Hayes is the Division Director of the United States Department of Homeland Security's Los Angeles branch at the time of Day 5. Vice President Hal Gardner authorizes her to absorb and essentially replace the workers at CTU - Los Angeles after a major terrorist attack leaves many of CTU's original employees dead. Hayes takes operational control of CTU. She decides to keep the survivors on staff until the crisis is over, against the advice of her assistant Miles Papazian. After the nerve gas is secured, Hayes vouches for CTU, but is ordered by the Vice President to fire them and fully absorb CTU into Homeland.

She gradually grows suspicious of her superiors when President Charles Logan issues an executive order for the detainment and arrest of Jack Bauer and later says that he will use the military to capture him. After one of her people from Homeland indirectly aids Jack Bauer, she learns from Mike Novick that Logan never contacted the military about Bauer and that no member of the executive office has yet seen Logan's "evidence" against Bauer. Based on the President's actions in the preceding hours, Hayes is convinced that Logan is indeed manipulating CTU in order to kill Bauer.

After Jack successfully obtains a confession from Logan, Hayes prepares to leave CTU for the day, under new orders to report to Washington, D.C. to fully report on the day's events. She acknowledges to Buchanan that she will strongly recommend to newly appointed President Gardner that he remain as Special Agent in Charge of CTU. At the end of the day, Buchanan invites Hayes for breakfast, though she asks for a rain check.

24: Season 6
Karen returns to Day 6, now married to Bill Buchanan. She had also been appointed as the White House National Security Advisor to President Wayne Palmer, several months previously. She frequently argues with Tom Lennox over plans of creating detention facilities and presidential pardon for Hamri Al-Assad. She briefly resigns after Tom Lennox threatens to expose the files that show that her husband released Fayed who is revealed to be a terrorist. At one point, she reluctantly fires Bill Buchanan to save her career.

However, Karen returns when she learns of a failed assassination plot against Wayne Palmer. She helps Wayne Palmer regain power when Vice President Noah Daniels attempts to launch a nuclear attack on the Middle East and when he invokes the 25th Amendment to become the President.

When Phillip Bauer offers to trade this component in exchange for his grandson Josh Bauer, Karen decides to defend Josh's rights and opposes the deal. When Tom and Daniels go on to do so, she secretly helps Jack Bauer to intervene. Although she is arrested for insubordination, Tom persuades Daniels to grant a pardon to Karen and Bill who will resign in return.

24: Season 7
She is neither seen nor mentioned in Season 7, though her husband Bill Buchanan returned. However, in TV Guide, Howard Gordon explained that Bill and Karen were still together in Season 7; there was a scene explaining her whereabouts, but it was ultimately cut from the script.

References

Television characters introduced in 2006
24 (TV series) characters
Fictional United States National Security Advisors
Fictional Department of Homeland Security personnel
Fictional Federal Bureau of Investigation personnel
American female characters in television